Line 5 of the Fuzhou Metro is a metro line in Fuzhou. The line opened on 29 April 2022. Line 5's color is  purple.

Opening timeline

Stations

References

05
Railway lines opened in 2022
2022 establishments in China